Czech Republic–Kazakhstan relations are bilateral relations between the Czech Republic and Kazakhstan.

History
Following World War II, both countries were under Soviet rule with the Czech Republic part of the Czechoslovak Socialist Republic as a satellite state and Kazakhstan as one of the constituent republics of the Soviet Union 

Modern diplomatic relations between the Kazakhstan and the Czech Republic were established on January 1, 1993. In 2012, Kazakh president Nursultan Nazarbayev met Czech president Václav Klaus during an official visit to the Czech Republic and Austria, and discussed deepening of economic cooperation. In 2014, Nazarbayev met president Miloš Zeman, discussing further economic cooperation of the countries and Czech assistance to diversifying of Kazakhstan's economy.

Trade and economy
Economic cooperation between the Czech Republic and Kazakhstan is based on  several bilateral agreements between the countries from 1996, 1998 and 2004. The bilateral trade turnover has grown from $200 in 2009 to $1.2 billion in 2014. Due to negative outcomes of the global economic crisis and falling oil prices, it dropped to $666 million in 2015. In 2015, most trade by Czech firms were in the fields of hi-tech engineering, instrumentation, agriculture and film industry.

Diplomatic missions

 The Czech Republic has an embassy in Nur-Sultan and a branch office of the embassy in Almaty.
 Kazakhstan has an embassy in Prague and an honorary consulate in Jaroměř.

Czech Ambassadors to Kazakhstan  
 (Embassy since December 1994)
 (VPD) Alexandr Langer 1995-1999 
 (VPD) Miroslav Andr 1999–2002 
 Milan Sedláček (Milan Sedláček) 2003-2007 
 Bedřich Kopecký (Bedřich Kopecký) 2008 – at least 2013, if not 2014  
 Eliška Zhigova (Eliška Žigová) 2014–2018  
 Rudolf Hykl (Rudolf Hykl) 2019–

See also
Foreign relations of the Czech Republic
Foreign relations of Kazakhstan
Kazakhstan–European Union relations
List of diplomatic missions of the Czech Republic
List of diplomatic missions of Kazakhstan

References

 
Kazakhstan
Czech Republic